Francesco Forte (born 12 October 1991) is an Italian professional footballer who plays as a goalkeeper for  club Monterosi.

Club career
In August 2020, Forte joined to Serie C club U.S. Avellino 1912.

On 11 January 2023, Forte moved to Monterosi.

References

External links 
 
 
 

1991 births
Living people
Sportspeople from the Province of Cosenza
Footballers from Calabria
Italian footballers
Association football goalkeepers
Serie C players
Serie D players
Vigor Lamezia players
A.C. Carpi players
U.S. Gavorrano players
S.S. Maceratese 1922 players
Rende Calcio 1968 players
Casertana F.C. players
U.S. Viterbese 1908 players
Carrarese Calcio players
U.S. Avellino 1912 players
Monterosi Tuscia F.C. players